Haraldssund is a settlement in the Faroe Islands, situated on the island of Kunoy.

Haraldssund is located on the east coast of Kunoy and is connected to the village of Kunoy on the west coast by a tunnel. To the east, it is linked to the town of Klaksvík on Borðoy by a causeway. The tunnel and the causeway were built in the late 1980s.

Two kilometers south of the village is a small ruin.

See also
 List of towns in the Faroe Islands

External links

Faroeislands.dk: Haraldssund Images and description of all cities on the Faroe Islands.

Populated places in the Faroe Islands
Kunoy